Hamar Jajab district is a district in the southeastern Banaadir region of Somalia. A sector of the national capital Mogadishu, it contains the Port of Mogadishu.

References
Districts of Somalia
Administrative map of Hamar Jab-Jab District

Districts of Somalia
Banaadir